The Rochambeau Library— A Community Library of Providence is an historic public library building at 708 Hope Street in Providence, Rhode Island.  It is a single-story brick structure with limestone trim, designed by Wallis E. Howe and built in 1930.  It has a symmetrical main facade, with the entrance in the center, sheltered by a porch supported by fluted Corinthian columns.  The flanking bays are pavilions with gable fronts.  A modern two-level addition with a glass front has been made to the north side of the building.

The building was listed on the National Register of Historic Places in 1998.

See also
National Register of Historic Places listings in Providence, Rhode Island
Wanskuck Library-Providence Community Library
South Providence Library-Providence Community Library
Smith Hill Library-Providence Community Library
Fox Point Library-Providence Community Library
Mount Pleasant Library-Providence Community Library
Olneyville Library-Providence Community Library
Washington Park Library-Providence Community Library
Knight Memorial Library-Providence Community Library

References

External links
Friends of Rochambeau website
Providence Community Library website

Library buildings completed in 1930
Public libraries in Rhode Island
Libraries on the National Register of Historic Places in Rhode Island
Buildings and structures in Providence, Rhode Island
Education in Providence County, Rhode Island
National Register of Historic Places in Providence, Rhode Island